Steven Cairns is an Irish professional boxer. As an amateur, he won 7 National Irish Titles and won silver in the 2015 European Youth Championships in Russia.

Amateur record
As an amateur, Steven compiled a record of 110 fights and 101 wins. He represented Ireland at the 2015 European Youth Championships, winning a silver medal.

Professional career
Steven made his professional debut on 5 June 2021, winning a unanimous decision against Rafael Castillo. He signed a promotional deal with Probellum and is currently trained by David Coldwell.

Steven's last bout was against Jose Hernadez in the Liverpool Arena on the 22nd of April 2022. He won by technical knockout (TKO) in the first round.

Professional boxing record

References 

Year of birth missing (living people)
Living people